The Midwest Athletic Conference is a high school athletic conference in northwestern Indiana, which has existed in two different incarnations, with a third planned to form in 2018. The original conference began in 1932, consisting of schools that were larger than most of their counterparts in their local county leagues. The schools were based in Benton, Fountain, Jasper, Newton, Tippecanoe, Warren, and White counties. The forming of the Kankakee Valley Conference the next year caused a slight fluctuation over the next couple of years, as schools realigned themselves within the two leagues, with some schools claiming dual membership. The league folded in 1947, as size disparities and willingness to sponsor some sports (such as football, some schools played 11-man or 8-man football, and others didn't sponsor the sport) led to schools going their separate ways.

The second incarnation of the conference began in 1955 with eight schools located in Benton, Carroll, Cass, Newton, and White counties, with largely different members than its first lineup. The MAC had a tumultuous history of membership turnover for much of its history, but had stabilized at 10 members with West Central and Winamac joining in 1980 and 1981, respectively. The only changes over the next 34 years were Rossville and Carroll joining the Hoosier Heartland Conference in 1989 and 1992, respectively, leaving a stable 8 school membership for more than two decades. In 2013, Caston, Pioneer, and Winamac announced that they were leaving the Conference to join with 2 other schools from the Northern State Conference as well as Independent North Judson for the 2015–2016 school year. This touched off an exodus that ended the conference, as West Central joined Caston, Pioneer, and Winamac in the Hoosier North Athletic Conference, while Frontier and Tri-County joined the Hoosier Heartland Conference. South Newton joined the Sangamon Valley Conference of Illinois. North White was the only school that had not been accepted to another conference immediately, though they were accepted as a football-only member of the Hoosier Heartland. The Conference reformed in 2017, with six former schools rejoining.

Membership

 Played in the Hoosier Heartland Conference 2015–18.
 Played in the NWHC 1975–98, as an Independent 1998-2007 and 2017–18, and in the GSSC 2007–17.
 Played as an Independent (football played in Hoosier Heartland) 2015–18.
 Played in the Sangamon Valley Conference (IL) 2015–18.
 Played 1975–80 in the NWHC, and 2015–19 in the HNAC, playing 2018–19 in both conferences.

Former members

 Concurrently played in MAC and NCC 1932–33, and in MAC and KVC 1933–47.
 Concurrently played in MAC and BCC 1932–47.
 Concurrently played in MAC and WCC 1932–34.
 Known as Rensselaer before 1939.
 Concurrently played in MAC and FCAA 1932–47.
 Concurrently played in MAC and BCC 1933–47.

Membership timeline

State Champs

North White High School
Football (A) 1994

Pioneer High School
Football (A) 1997

Tri-County High School
Baseball (A) 1998

References

Resources
IHSAA Conference Membership
IHSAA State Champions
IHSAA Directory

Indiana high school athletic conferences
High school sports conferences and leagues in the United States